Reial Club Deportiu Espanyol de Barcelona is a Spanish association football club based in Barcelona. This list encompasses honours won by Espanyol and records set by the club and their players.

Statistics

Statistics in La Liga

Seasons in La Liga: 85 
Best position in La Liga: 3 (2 times) 
Worst position in La Liga: 20 (2019–20) 
Most goals scored in a season: 82 (1950–51) 
Most goals scored in a match: Espanyol 8 - Real Sociedad 0 (1941–42)
Most goals conceded in a match: Athletic Bilbao 9 - Espanyol 0 (1928–29)

Overall seasons table in La Liga
 
{|class="wikitable"
|-bgcolor="#efefef"
!  Pos.
! Club  
! Season In D1
! Pl.
! W
! D
! L
! GS
! GA
! Dif.
! Pts
!Champion
!2nd place
!3rd place
!4th place
|-
|align=center|7
|Espanyol
|align=center|85
|align=center|2740
|align=center|979
|align=center|642
|align=center|1119
|align=center|3720
|align=center|4034
|align=center|-314
|align=center|2919
| align=center bgcolor=gold| 0
| align=center bgcolor=silver| 0
| align=center bgcolor=bronze| 4
| align=center | 5
|}

Last updated: 1 September 2020
 
Pos. = Position; Pl = Match played; W = Win; D = Draw; L = Lost; GS = Goals Scored; GA = Goals against; P = Points.
Colors: Gold = winner; Silver = runner-up.

General statistics

All-time top scorer: Raúl Tamudo with 140 goals 
Most Appearances: Raúl Tamudo with 389 matches 
Player who has won most titles: José Prat, David García, Alberto Lopo, Mauricio Pochettino and Raúl Tamudo with 2 titles

Milestone goals in La Liga

Goalscoring records

Domestic league goals

Zamora Winners

References

Records And Statistics
Espanyol
Records